formerly known as Sugimura International Patent and Trademark Attorneys is an intellectual property law firm based in Japan. The firm has an international presence, representing clients from around the world. The firm represents more than 200 clients ranging from single inventors and start-ups to academic institutions and international corporations. Approximately half of Sugimura's client base consists of Japanese businesses and organizations, while the other half is foreign counterparts. It has a global legal network in over 40 countries.

History
Sugimura was founded in 1923 by patent attorney and engineer Nobuchika Sugimura. The firm specializes in providing quality legal services in the acquisition, protection and consultation of Japanese IP rights, and is repeatedly ranked among the top Japanese patent and trademark firms. The company has offices in Japan and the United States, as well as professional relationships with associate law firms located in more than 80 countries. In 2017, the firm changed its name from Sugimura International Patent and Trademark Attorneys to Sugimura & Partners. Today, Kenji Sugimura. Principal Patent Attorney, and Koji Sugimura, Principal Attorney at Law are leading the firm.

Offices
It is headquartered in the Kasumigaseki Common Gate West Tower in Kasumigaseki, Chiyoda, Tokyo, Japan, and has a representative office in San Jose, California, U.S.A.

Rankings
Sugimura is repeatedly ranked among top Japanese law firms.

The firm is consistently ranked on the World IP Survey. The firm has been ranked in the patent prosecution and trademark prosecution categories.

World Trademark Review recognizes the firm as a leading trademark professional in Japan.

Intellectual Asset Management recognizes the firm as a leading patent professional in Japan.

Asian Legal Business recognizes the firm as a leading domestic patent firm.

The firm appears in the Legal 100 of Acquisition International magazine, a vanity award

Notable representations
Hidetsugu Yagi, Inventor of Yagi–Uda antenna
Irène Joliot-Curie, Atomic Energy Generation Device Case
Valentino Garavani, Rudolph Valentino Case

Publications
Patent attorneys from Sugimura have featured in or written various articles about IP industries, and have been invited as speakers at various institutes and IP meetings.

References

Law firms of Japan
Patent law firms
Intellectual property law firms
Law firms established in 1923
Japanese companies established in 1923